Tubulanus is a genus of primitive nemertean worms in the order Palaeonemertea.

Species
The World Register of Marine Species includes the following species in the genus:

 Tubulanus albocinctus (Coe, 1904)
 Tubulanus annulatus (Montagu, 1804)
 Tubulanus aureus (Joubin, 1904)
 Tubulanus borealis Friedrich, 1936
 Tubulanus capistratus (Coe, 1901)
 Tubulanus cingulatus (Coe, 1904)
 Tubulanus ezoensis Yamaoka, 1940
 Tubulanus floridanus Coe, 1951
 Tubulanus frenatus (Coe, 1904)
 Tubulanus groenlandicus (Bergendal, 1902)
 Tubulanus holorhynchocoelomicus Friedrich, 1958
 Tubulanus hylbomi Gibson & Sundberg, 1999
 Tubulanus linearis (McIntosh, 1874)
 Tubulanus longivasculus Gibson & Sundberg, 1999
 Tubulanus lucidus Iwata, 1952
 Tubulanus lutescens Cantell, 2001
 Tubulanus norvegicus Senz, 1993
 Tubulanus panormitanus Monastero, 1930
 Tubulanus pellucidus (Coe, 1895)
 Tubulanus polymorphus Renier, 1804
 Tubulanus punctatus (Takakura, 1898)
 Tubulanus rhabdotus Corrêa, 1954
 Tubulanus riceae Ritger & Norenburg, 2006
 Tubulanus roretzi Senz, 1997
 Tubulanus rubicundus (Bürger, 1892)
 Tubulanus sexlineatus (Griffin, 1898)
 Tubulanus superbus (Kölliker, 1845)
 Tubulanus tamias Kajihara, Kakui, Yamasaki & Hiruta, 2015
 Tubulanus tubicola (Kennel, 1891)

References

Palaeonemertea
Nemertea genera